is an action platform video game.

Gameplay
Psychic World is a platform game wherein the player's character Lucía runs from one stage to the other using her "ESP Booster" to blast monstrous enemies while obtaining item power-ups through them or by jumping on various ledges and platforms. The Booster has a gauge of how often certain items and abilities can be used, but that, as with her health, can be replenished by power-ups. All her weapons are upgradeable by merely picking up the same item for that particular weapon and new weapons are obtained through mini-bosses and end-level bosses. The player has to use Lucia's psionic weapons strategically in levels using different elements to their advantage (in the ice stage, rocks being doused by falling water can be frozen and used as a stable platform for Lucía to jump on by blasting the rock with the ice shot, while the sonic wave weapon can destroy certain foreground objects blocking her path).

Plot
Taking place at a remote laboratory in the year 19XX, a three-staff research team consisting of Dr. Knavik and his assistants the TWIN sisters Cecile and Lucia is studying the exploration and usage of ESP. One day while Lucia was getting ready for work, an explosion burst from the lab. By the time Lucia got there, Dr. Knavik was all right, but Cecile had disappeared. Dr. Knavik explains that part of his experiments involved running tests on a variety of monsters, but eventually the subjects rebelled and took Cecile with them. As Lucia follows the monster's track, Dr. Knavik gives her the ESP Booster, a device he created that will enable the user to wield psychic powers.

Reception
Psychic World for the Master System was given mixed but mostly positive reviews 70% by RAZE, and 69% by Video Games. The Game Gear version received a score of 83% from Joystick.

References

External links

1988 video games
Action video games
Master System games
MSX2 games
Sanritsu Denki games
Science fiction video games
Game Gear games
Side-scrolling platform games
Video games about psychic powers
Video games developed in Japan
Video games featuring female protagonists
Video games set in the 1990s